This is a recap of the 1991 season for the Professional Bowlers Association (PBA) Tour.  It was the tour's 33rd season, and consisted of 36 events.

The 1991 season featured the infamous "Del Ballard, Jr. gutter ball." Needing two strikes and seven pins in the tenth frame to defeat Pete Weber for the title at the Fair Lanes Open, Ballard got the necessary first two strikes. But he then inexplicably tossed his fill ball into the channel, handing Weber the title.

Ballard would rebound to win four titles in 1991, but it was another four-time winner, David Ozio, who claimed PBA Player of the Year honors. Among his four titles on the season, Ozio was victorious at the Firestone Tournament of Champions. The televised finals for this event were delayed 40 minutes due to a bomb threat, which turned out to be a prank call.

Mike Miller won his first-ever PBA title at the PBA National Championship, while Pete Weber captured the second BPAA U.S. Open title of his career, and fourth major title overall. Post-interview after winning the tournament, Pete held up the trophy above his head, and the cast resin eagle attachment unexpectedly fell from the base and shattered into pieces upon hitting the floor. Telecast commentator and longtime professional Nelson Burton, Jr. later suspected guilt for the mishap, recalling that before they went on the air, he unscrewed the nut that held the eagle in place and showed it to the audience before putting it back on the base, neglecting to secure the nut back on. He cannot remember fully if this is the case, but believes it is. Weber was mailed a replacement trophy a few days later.

John Mazza made PBA TV history in a semi-final match at the Bud Light Classic, when he became just the second person ever to convert the 7-10 split on national television. (Mark Roth was the first.)  Jess Stayrook would become the third player to accomplish the same feat, later in the season at the Tucson Open.

Tournament schedule

References

External links
1991 Season Schedule

Professional Bowlers Association seasons
1991 in bowling